"Fair Margaret and Sweet William" (Child 74, Roud 253) is a traditional English ballad which tells of two lovers, of whom either one or both die from heartbreak. Thomas Percy included it in his folio and said that it was quoted as early as 1611 in the Knight of the Burning Pestle. In the United States, variations of Fair Margaret have been regarded as folk song as early as 1823.

Synopsis

Fair Margaret espies the marriage procession of her lover Sweet William and another woman from her high chamber window. Depending on the variation, Margaret either commits suicide or dies of a broken heart. Her ghost then appears before Sweet William to ask him if he loves his new bride more than herself, and William replies he loves Margaret better. In the morning, William commences to search for Margaret. Upon arriving at her estate, Margaret's family shows William the corpse. In some versions, Sweet William dies of heartbreak as well, and they are buried beside each other.

Variations and related ballads
Regional and printed variations of the ballad are known by many titles, including "Lady Margaret and Sweet William", "Pretty Polly and Sweet William", "Sweet William's Bride", "Lady Margaret's Ghost", "Fair Margaret's Misfortune", and "William and Margaret", among others. Numerous variations on this basic structure can be found in folk songs throughout the British Isles and United States. Renowned folklorist Francis James Child identified three distinct versions of the lyrics, whilst Cecil Sharp collected numerous other variants, considering the ballad "Sweet William's Ghost" (Child 77) to be a slight variation on the basic plot.

Traditional versions of Fair Margaret sometimes end with a "rose-briar motif" of several stanzas describing floral growth on the lovers' neighboring graves. This motif is featured in other ballads, including "Lord Thomas and Fair Annet", "Lord Lovel", and "Barbara Allen". Fair Margaret also shares some mid-song stanzas with the murder ballad "Matty Groves" (Child ballad 81, Roud 52).

Traditional recordings 
In the United States, traditional Appalachian musicians such as Bascom Lamar Lunsford (1953) and Jean Ritchie (1956) recorded their family versions of the ballad, as did many Ozark performers such as Almeda Riddle of Arkansas (1972). Helen Hartness Flanders collected several versions of the song throughout New England in the 1930s and 40s, which she heard performed to five different melodies.

In England, several versions were collected across the country, but the ballad appears to have largely died out before recordings could be made. Cecil Sharp collected some versions in Somerset around 1910, and Frank Kidson collected a single version in Knaresborough, Yorkshire in 1906. In Scotland, the only recording was a fragment sung by a Mabel Skelton of Arbroath to Hamish Henderson in 1985, which is available on the Tobar an Dualchais website. Likewise, only a single version has been recorded in Ireland, that of Martin Howley of County Clare, which can be heard online courtesy of the County Clare Library.

Lyrics 
The following lyrics are those recorded by Thomas Percy in 1765, but they bear a striking resemblance to the Ritchie family version sung by Jean Ritchie in 1956, which presumably survived in the oral tradition for several centuries largely uncorrupted.

Sweet William arose one May morning,

And dressed himself in blue,

Come and tell to me all about that love

Betwixt Lady Marg'ret and me.

No harm, no harm of Lady Marg'ret,

Nor she knows none by me,

But before tomorrow morning at eight o'clock,

Lady Marg'ret and you.

O I know nothing of Lady Marg'ret's love

And she knows nothing of me

But in the morning at half-past eight

Lady Marg'ret my bride shall see.

Lady Marg'ret was sitting in her bower room

A-combing back her hair,

When who should she spy but Sweet William and his bride,

As to church they did draw nigh.

Then she threw down her ivory comb

In silk bound up her hair.

And out of the room that fair lady ran,

and was never any more seen there.

The day passed away and the night coming on

And most of the men asleep,

Sweet William espied Lady Marg'ret's ghost

A-standing at his bed feet.

O how do you like your bed? said she,

And how do you like your sheets

And how do you like that fair young bride

A-laying in your arms at sleep?

Full well do I like my bed,

Full well do I like my sheet;

But better do I like the fair young maid

A-standing at my bed feet.

The night passed away and the day coming on

And most of the men awake.

Sweet William said: I am troubled in my head

By the dreams that I dreamed last night.

Such dreams, such dreams as these,

I know they mean no good,

Last night I dreamed that my room was full of swine

And my bride was floating in blood.

He called his servants unto him,

By one, by two, by three,

And the last he called was his new made bride

That he Lady Marg'ret I might see.

O what will you do with Lady Marg'ret's love,

And what will you do with me?

He said: I'll go Lady Marg'ret see,

And then I'll return to thee.

He rode up to Lady Marg'ret's door,

And jingled at the ring;

And none was so ready as her seventh born brother

To arise and let him in.

O is she in her kitchen room?

Or is she in her hall?

Or is she in her bower room

Among her merry maids all?

She is neither in her kitchen room,

She is neither in her hall;

But she is in her cold coffin,

With her pale face toward the wall.

Pulld own, pull down those winding-sheets

A-made of satin so fine.

Ten thousand times thou hast kissed my lips

And now, love, I'll kiss thine.

Three times he kissed her snowy white breast,

Three times he kissed her chin;

but when he kissed her cold clay lipse

His heart it broke within.

Lady Marg'ret was buried in the old church yard

Sweet William was buried close beside her;

And out of her grew a red, red, rose,

And ou of him a brier.

They grew so tall and they grew so high,

They scarce could grow no higher;

And there they twined in a true lover's knot,

The red rose and the brier.

References

External links

Cover list at SecondHandSongs.com

Child Ballads
Fictional ghosts
Fiction about suicide